Charles Allen White Jr. (born October 24, 1987) is an American former competitive ice dancer. With partner Meryl Davis, he is the 2014 Olympic Champion, the 2010 Olympic silver medalist, a two-time (2011, 2013) World champion, five-time Grand Prix Final champion (2009–2013), three-time Four Continents champion (2009, 2011, 2013) and six-time U.S. national champion (2009–2014). They also won a bronze medal in the team event at the 2014 Winter Olympics.

Davis and White teamed up in 1997 and they are currently the longest-lasting dance team in the United States. They are the first American ice dancers to win the World title, as well as the first Americans to win the Olympic title. At the 2006 NHK Trophy, they became the first ice dancing team to receive level fours on all their elements.

Personal life
White was born in the Detroit suburb of Royal Oak, Michigan, the son of Jacqui and Charlie White Sr. He attended Roeper School in Birmingham, Michigan from nursery school through high school where he played violin in the school string quartet and was involved with the student government. White graduated in 2005. He later enrolled at the University of Michigan, studying political science. He formerly competed as an ice hockey player and helped his team to a state championship. He has asthma.

White lives in Ann Arbor, Michigan.

In 2010, his then-girlfriend, ice dancer Tanith Belbin, retired from competition and moved to Michigan to be with him. Belbin and White became engaged in June 2014, and were married on April 25, 2015. In 2017, their son was born.

Career

Early career
White began skating at age five. He originally competed as both a single skater and an ice dancer. As a single skater, he won the bronze medal at the 2004 U.S. Championships on the Novice level, and competed internationally on the junior level. He quit skating singles following the 2005–06 season in order to focus on ice dancing.

He began ice dancing when he was seven at his coach's advice, who hoped it would smooth out White's skating. He was partnered with Meryl Davis in 1997, by Seth Chafetz. In 2009, Davis said: "Charlie and I grew up 10 minutes apart from each other. Our parents are best friends. We've grown together and know each other so well."

In their first season together, Davis/White won the silver medal at the Junior Olympics in the Juvenile division. In 1999-00, they won gold at the Junior Olympics on the intermediate level. In the 2000–01 season, they qualified for the 2001 U.S. Championships, placing 6th as Novices. In 2001-02, they won the silver medal as novices and then moved up to the junior level. In the 2002-03 season, they did not win a medal at either of their two Junior Grand Prix assignments and placed 7th at the 2003 U.S. Championships in their junior debut.

Junior career
In the 2003–04 season, Davis/White won their sectional championship and then won the junior silver medal at Nationals. This earned them a trip to the 2004 Junior Worlds, where they placed 13th.

In the 2004–2005 season, Davis/White won two bronze on the ISU Junior Grand Prix series. However, White broke his ankle before Sectionals and so Davis/White were unable to qualify for the 2005 U.S. Championships. Their season ended there.

In the 2005–06 season, Davis/White medaled at both their Junior Grand Prix events and placed second at the Junior Grand Prix Final. They won the junior national title at the 2006 U.S. Championships and then won the bronze medal at the 2006 Junior Worlds. Following that season, Davis aged out of Juniors. They lost some training time after White broke his ankle at a hockey tournament in 2006.

Senior career

Post-competitive career
Davis and White continue to perform together in ice shows and White has also worked on television as an ice dancing commentator. On February 23, 2017, they confirmed that they would not return to competition.

Coaching Career 
In 2022, White opened the Michigan Ice Dance Academy with Tanith Belbin White and Greg Zuerlein in Canton, Michigan. 

Their current teams include:

 Emily Bratti / Ian Somerville
 Molly Cesanek / Yehor Yehorov
 Caroline Green / Michael Parsons

Their former teams include:

 Katarina Wolfkostin / Jeffrey Chen

Programs

Competitive highlights

Singles career

Detailed results
(with Davis)

Dancing with the Stars

On March 4, 2014, White was announced as one of the contestants on the 18th season of Dancing with the Stars paired with professional dancer Sharna Burgess. He competed against his very own skating partner, Meryl Davis, who was also cast to take part on the 18th season of the show. Despite receiving high scores and praise from the judges week to week, White and Burgess were eliminated during the season's semifinals, finishing in 5th place.

Dancing with the Stars performances

1Score given by guest judge Robin Roberts.

2For this week only, as part of the "Partner Switch-Up" week, White did not perform with Sharna Burgess and instead performed with Peta Murgatroyd.

3Score given by guest judge Julianne Hough.

4Score given by guest judge Donny Osmond.

5Score given by guest judge Redfoo.

6Score given by guest judge Ricky Martin.

7Score given by guest judge Abby Lee Miller.

8Score given by guest judge Kenny Ortega.

References

External links

 
 
 Meryl Davis / Charlie White  at IceNetwork
 
 
 
 - 1998 Juvenile silver medalists

1987 births
Living people
Sportspeople from Royal Oak, Michigan
American male ice dancers
Figure skaters at the 2010 Winter Olympics
Olympic silver medalists for the United States in figure skating
World Figure Skating Championships medalists
Four Continents Figure Skating Championships medalists
World Junior Figure Skating Championships medalists
Medalists at the 2010 Winter Olympics
Figure skaters at the 2014 Winter Olympics
Medalists at the 2014 Winter Olympics
Olympic bronze medalists for the United States in figure skating
Olympic gold medalists for the United States in figure skating
Season-end world number one figure skaters
Season's world number one figure skaters
University of Michigan alumni